Andrew Schofield may refer to:
 Andrew Schofield (actor) (born 1958), also known as Drew Schofield, British actor
 Andrew N. Schofield (born 1930), British civil engineer
 Andy Schofield (Andrew John Schofield), theoretical physicist